Owen Building may refer to:
 Owen Building (Columbia, South Carolina)
 Owen Building (Sheffield Hallam University)